Overcast was an American metalcore band that started in the early 1990s, but broke up in 1998 after an unsuccessful tour. The band is often regarded as pioneers of metalcore.

In 2006, they reunited to play the 2006 installment of the New England Metal and Hardcore Festival, and announced that they would release a new album entitled Reborn to Kill Again with 11 re-recorded classic tracks and two unreleased tracks. In 2011, ex-Overcast bandmates Mike D'Antonio, Pete Cortese and Brian Fair announced the formation of their new side-project, Death Ray Vision.

Discography

Studio albums 
 Expectational Dilution (1994)
 Fight Ambition to Kill (1997)
 Reborn to Kill Again (2008)

Extended plays 
 Bleed into One (1992)
 Twin Terror Split (1995)   
 Stirring the Killer (1995)   
 Begging for Indifference (1996)   
 Overcast / Arise Split (1996)   
 In These Black Days Vol. 4 Split (1998)

Members 
 Brian Fair - vocals
 Mike D'Antonio - bass
 Scott McCooe - lead guitar
 Pete Cortese - rhythm guitar
 Jay Fitzgerald - drums

References

External links 
 Overcast.cc website (archive)

Heavy metal musical groups from Massachusetts
Metal Blade Records artists
Metalcore musical groups from Massachusetts